The title Battle of Konotop may refer to either:

Battle of Konotop (1659)
Battle of Konotop (2022)